(28 March 1912 – 15 August 1945) was a Japanese military officer and one of the chief conspirators in the Kyūjō incident, a plot to seize the Imperial Palace and to prevent the broadcast of Emperor Hirohito's surrender speech to mark the end of World War II.

Military career 

Hatanaka served in the Military Affairs Section of the Japanese Ministry of War at the end of World War II. As one of the leaders of a group of Japanese officers determined to prevent the acceptance of the Potsdam Declaration and therefore the surrender of Japan, Hatanaka attempted a coup d'état on 14–15 August 1945. Failing to obtain the support of the War Minister, General Korechika Anami, Hatanaka organised a number of other officers and succeeded in occupying the Imperial Palace and Imperial Household Ministry.

Still needing high-level support for his cause, he tried to enlist Lieutenant General Takeshi Mori, commander of the 1st Imperial Guard Division. Mori was non-committal and a frustrated Hatanaka shot and killed him. Hatanaka and his men then spent several hours searching for the recording that had been made of the Emperor's speech announcing the surrender of Japan, and which was meant for public broadcast. When he failed to locate the recordings, he occupied the NHK Building in an attempt to prevent the speech from being broadcast. However, still without high level support and the recordings, Hatanaka abandoned his coup after receiving direct orders to do so from Eastern District Army Headquarters.

Following the failure of the coup, Hatanaka traveled to the plaza fronting the Imperial Palace. Along with his fellow conspirator, Lieutenant Colonel Jirō Shiizaki, he shot himself. In Hatanaka's pocket was found his death poem:
{|align=center cellpadding="5" cellspacing="1" style="border:1px solid black; background-color:#e7e8ff;"
|- align=center bgcolor=#d7a8ff
|- 
!Japanese text||Romanized Japanese||English translation
|- valign=top
|
今はただ
思ひ殘すこと
なかりけり
暗雲去りし
御世となりなば
|
ima wa tada
omoinokosu koto
nakarikeri
an'un sarishimi-yo to narinaba|
I have nothing to regretnow that the dark clouds have disappearedfrom the reign of the Emperor.
|-
|}

 See also 
 Surrender of Japan

 Notes 

 References 
 Hoyt, Edwin P. (1986), Japan's War: The Great Pacific Conflict, 1853–1952. McGraw-Hill.
 Toland, John (1970), The Rising Sun: The Decline and Fall of the Japanese Empire 1936 – 1945''. Random House.

1912 births
1945 deaths
Military personnel from Kyoto Prefecture
Japanese rebels
Kyūjō incident
Imperial Japanese Army personnel of World War II
Japanese military personnel who committed suicide
Imperial Japanese Army officers
Suicides by firearm in Japan